Luigi Spagnolli (born 10 February 1960) is an Italian politician.

He is a member of the Democratic Party and served as Mayor of Bolzano for three terms from 2005 to 2015.

See also
2005 Italian local elections
2010 Italian local elections
2015 Italian local elections
List of mayors of Bolzano

References

External links
 

1960 births
Living people
Mayors of Bolzano
Democratic Party (Italy) politicians
Senators of Legislature XIX of Italy
20th-century Italian people